James Henry Finn (sometimes Fynn) VC (24 November 1893 – 30 March 1917) was a recipient of the Victoria Cross, the highest and most prestigious award for gallantry in the face of the enemy that can be awarded to British and Commonwealth forces. He was also awarded the Order of Karageorge, which is Serbia's equivalent to the Victoria Cross.

Early life
Finn was born in St Clement near Truro, Cornwall. His father, John Finn, served in the Duke of Cornwall's Light Infantry in the Boer War, and again in the Special Reserve during the First World War. James Finn served as a territorial soldier with the 5th Battalion, DCLI before moving to the South Wales Valleys looking for work. He eventually found employment at the colliery at Cwmtillery near Abertillery.

Military service
On the outbreak of war, he immediately enlisted with the local regiment, the South Wales Borderers and was duly posted to their 4th (Service) Battalion. On enlistment, his surname was incorrectly recorded as "Fynn".

On 15 July 1915, the battalion landed at Gallipoli. Fynn was wounded in the knee and chest, and invalided back to Britain.  After the withdrawal from Gallipoli, the battalion had moved to Mesopotamia, and Fynn rejoined them there.  He acted as orderly to the commanding officer, Lt. Col. C. E. Kitchen.

It was on 9 April 1916 at Sanna-i-Yat, Mesopotamia (now Iraq), that 22-year-old Private Fynn earned the Victoria Cross for his bravery.

Fynn was decorated with the ribbon of the VC by Lt Gen Sir Stanley Maude at Amara on 5 November 1916.  On 29 March 1917 he was wounded in the leg in an engagement at Marl Plain, 50 miles north of Baghdad.  He was taken by stretcher to the field ambulance the next day, but on the way he was struck in the side by another bullet, which proved fatal.

The VC was presented to his father at a public investiture in Hyde Park on 2 June 1917 by King George V.

Fynn was also mentioned in dispatches (London Gazette, 19 October 1916).  He was awarded the Serbian Cross of the Karageorge (1st Class) with swords (London Gazette, 15 February 1917).

Legacy
His memorial at Basra, Iraq can be found at panel numbers 16 and 32 on the Basra Memorial which was originally sited within Basra War Cemetery.

In 1966, Fynn was also remembered at his home town of Bodmin when an estate was named "Finn VC Estate" in his honour. A plaque commemorating the event was unveiled, and can be seen opposite the old library in Bodmin. His VC was donated to the town council but is not on public display.

Whilst his body was never returned to Cornwall he is remembered on his father's headstone in Bodmin Cemetery.

In March, 2016 a commemorative paving stone was unveiled at Mount Folly in Bodmin

There are memorials also at Havard Chapel, Brecon Cathedral; St Michael's Church, Abertillery; Town War Memorial, Abertillery.

There is a painting of the action which was published in The Sphere, Tatler, and also The Times Illustrated History of the Great War.  The original artwork was by Ugo Matania and is held at the Wellcome Library, London.

References

External links
 Victoria Cross details

South Wales Borderers soldiers
British Army personnel of World War I
British World War I recipients of the Victoria Cross
British military personnel killed in World War I
1893 births
1917 deaths
People from Truro
People from Bodmin
Burials at Basra War Cemetery